The Diomede Islands, also known in Russia as Gvozdev Islands, consist of two rocky, mesa-like islands:

The Diomede Islands are located in the middle of the Bering Strait between mainland Alaska and Siberia. To the north is the Chukchi Sea and to the south is the Bering Sea. Fairway Rock,  to the southeast, is also Alaskan, but generally not seen as part of the Diomede Islands. If marginal seas are considered, then they are the northernmost islands within the entire Pacific Ocean. Because they are separated by the International Date Line, Big Diomede is almost a day ahead of Little Diomede, but not completely; due to locally defined time zones, Big Diomede is only 21 hours ahead of Little Diomede (20 in summer). Because of this, the islands are sometimes called Tomorrow Island (Big Diomede) and Yesterday Island (Little Diomede).

Etymology
The islands are named for the Greek Saint Diomedes; Danish navigator Vitus Bering sighted the Diomede Islands on 16 August (O.S., 27 August N.S.) 1728, the day on which the Russian Orthodox Church celebrates the memory of the saint.

Location
The small habitation on Little Diomede Island is centered on the west side of the island at the village of Diomede.

Big Diomede Island is the easternmost point of Russia.

The Diomede Islands are often mentioned as likely intermediate stops for the hypothetical bridge or tunnel (Bering Strait crossing) spanning the Bering Strait.

During winter, an ice bridge usually spans the distance between these two islands; therefore during such times it is theoretically possible (although not legal, since travel between the two islands is forbidden) to walk between the United States and Russia.

History

The first European to reach the Bering Strait was the Russian explorer Semyon Dezhnev in 1648. He reported two islands whose natives had bone lip ornaments, but it is not certain that these were the Diomedes. Danish navigator Vitus Bering re-discovered the Diomede Islands while leading a Russian expedition on 16 August (O.S., 26 August N.S.) 1728, the day when the Russian Orthodox Church celebrates the memory of the martyr St. Diomede (hence, the name of the islands). In 1732, a Russian geodesist, Mikhail Gvozdev, determined longitude and latitude for the two islands.

The text of the 1867 treaty between the United States and Russia which finalized the Alaska Purchase uses the islands to designate the boundary between the two nations: the border separates "equidistantly Krusenstern Island, or Ignaluk, from Ratmanov Island, or Nunarbuk, and heads northward infinitely until it disappears completely in the Arctic Ocean."

During the Cold War, that gap constituted the border between the United States and the Soviet Union, and became known as the "Ice Curtain". In 1987, however, Lynne Cox swam from one island to the other, and was congratulated by both Mikhail Gorbachev and Ronald Reagan for her feat.

In summer 1995, British television actor and documentary presenter Michael Palin started his counterclockwise circumnavigation of the Pacific Rim, encompassing 18 countries, on Little Diomede Island, as part of the BBC series Full Circle. He intended to set foot on it again at the end of his eight-month trek, but was unable to do so because of rough seas.

Big Diomede Island was traditionally the easternmost landmass before the International Date Line, and the first landmass to ring in a new year, if using local solar time. When using official time, however, a large area in eastern Russia and New Zealand also share the same time zone. New Zealand also has daylight saving time in effect during late December, but Russia does not (see time in New Zealand and time in Russia). This became moot in 1995, however, when the International Date Line was moved to the east of Kiribati and that country's easternmost time zone (GMT+14) is now the world's earliest.

After they established a military base there in 1948, the Soviet government relocated the indigenous population of Big Diomede Island to mainland Russia. The island is now inhabited only by military units. Little Diomede had an Inupiat population of 170, which had declined to 115 at the 2010 census, entirely in the village site on the west side of the island, though the island as a whole comprises the city of Diomede. This village has a school, a post office and a store. Some residents are famous for their ivory carving. When weather permits, commercial air contact is maintained with the island as part of the US Essential Air Service.

See also
List of islands of Alaska
List of islands of Russia

Notes

References

External links

Images of the islands
Little Diomede page, with images
Proposed Trans-Global Highway and AmerAsian Peace Tunnel
Michael Palin site about Diomedes

 
International archipelagoes
Islands of Alaska
Islands of the Chukchi Sea
Islands of the Bering Sea
Islands of Nome Census Area, Alaska
Islands of Chukotka Autonomous Okrug
Islands of Unorganized Borough, Alaska
Bering Strait